The 2022 Southern Miss Golden Eagles football team represented the University of Southern Mississippi as a new member of the Sun Belt Conference during the 2022 NCAA Division I FBS football season. They were led by head coach Will Hall, who was coaching his second season with the team. The Golden Eagles played their home games at M. M. Roberts Stadium in Hattiesburg, Mississippi.

Previous season

Preseason

Recruiting class

Sun Belt coaches poll
The Sun Belt coaches poll was released on July 25, 2022. The Golden Eagles were picked to finish fifth in the West Division.

Sun Belt Preseason All-Conference teams

Special teams

2nd team
Camron harrell – Right Safety, SR

Schedule
Southern Miss and the Sun Belt Conference announced the 2022 football schedule on March 1, 2022.

Game summaries

Liberty

at No. 15 Miami (FL)

Northwestern State

at Tulane

at Troy

Arkansas State

at Texas State

Louisiana

Georgia State

at Coastal Carolina

South Alabama

at Louisiana-Monroe

vs. Rice (LendingTree Bowl)

References

Southern Miss
Southern Miss Golden Eagles football seasons
LendingTree Bowl champion seasons
Southern Miss Golden Eagles football